This is a partial list of notable democratic socialists.

Politicians

Heads of government 

 Salvador Allende, President of Chile (1970–1973)
 Jacobo Árbenz, President of Guatemala (1951–1954)
 Clement Attlee, Prime Minister of the United Kingdom (1945–1951)
 Michelle Bachelet, President of Chile (2006–2010; 2014–2018)
 David Ben-Gurion, Prime Minister of Israel (1948–1954; 1955–1963)
 Léon Blum, Prime Minister of France (1936–1937; 1938)
 Willy Brandt, Chancellor of Germany (1969–1974)
 Álvaro Colom, President of Guatemala (2008–2012)
 Alexander Dubček, leader of the Czechoslovak Socialist Republic (1968–1969)
 Peter Fraser, Prime Minister of New Zealand (1940–1949)
 Mauricio Funes, President of El Salvador (2009–2014)
 Mikhail Gorbachev, Soviet leader (1985–1991)
 António Guterres, Prime-Minister of Portugal (1995 - 2002) and Secretary General of the United Nations (2016 - present)
 Cheddi Jagan, President of Guyana (1992–1997)
 Norman Kirk, Prime Minister of New Zealand (1972–1974)
 Fernando Lugo, President of Paraguay (2008–2012)
 Ramsay MacDonald, Prime Minister of the United Kingdom (1924; 1929–1935)
 Nelson Mandela, President of South Africa (1994–1999)
 Michael Manley, Prime Minister of Jamaica (1972–1980)
 François Mitterrand, President of France (1981–1995)
 José Mujica, President of Uruguay (2010–2015)
 Walter Nash, Prime Minister of New Zealand (1957–1960)
 Jawaharlal Nehru, Prime Minister of India (1947–1964)
 Olof Palme, Prime Minister of Sweden (1969–1976; 1982–1986)
 José Ramos-Horta, President of East Timor (2007–2012)
 Giuseppe Saragat, President of Italy (1964–1971)
 Michael Joseph Savage, Prime Minister of New Zealand (1935–1940)
 Luiz Inácio Lula da Silva, President of Brazil (2003–2011, 2023-present)
 Sutan Sjahrir, Prime Minister of Indonesia (1945–1947)
 Mário Soares, Founder and Leader of the Socialist Party (1973 - 1986), Prime-Minister of Portugal (1976 - 1978 / 1983 - 1986) and President of the Portuguese Republic (1986 - 1996)
 Kalevi Sorsa, Prime Minister of Finland (1972–1975; 1977–1979; 1982–1987)
 Alexis Tsipras, Prime Minister of Greece (2015–2019)
 Tabaré Vázquez, President of Uruguay (2005–2010; 2015–2020)
 Chris Watson, Prime Minister of Australia (1904)
 Harold Wilson, Prime Minister of the United Kingdom (1964–1970; 1974–1976)

Disputed

Other politicians 

Niki Ashton, member of Parliament of Canada, two time Leadership candidate
 Obafemi Awolowo, Premier of the Western State of Nigeria (1954–1960)
 Tony Benn, member of the Labour Party and founder of the Socialist Campaign Group
 Eduard Bernstein, member of the Social Democratic Party of Germany
 Aneurin Bevan, father of the National Health Service
 Louis Blanc, member of the French Provisional Government of 1848
 Lee J. Carter, member of the Virginia House of Delegates
Alexandre Boulerice, deputy leader of the NDP, member of parliament of Canada
 Jeremy Corbyn, leader of the Labour Party and Leader of the Opposition
 Anthony Crosland, member of the Labour Party
 Eugene V. Debs, five-time Socialist Party of America presidential candidate
 Tommy Douglas, father of Medicare
 Evan Durbin, member of the Labour Party
 Michael Foot, leader of the Labour Party and Leader of the Opposition
 Peter Hain, member of the Labour Party
 Joel Harden, member of the Ontario Provincial Parliament.
 Michael Harrington, founder of the Democratic Socialists of America
 Denis Healey, member of the Labour Party
 Karl Kautsky, member of the Social Democratic Party of Germany
 Neil Kinnock, leader of the Labour Party and Leader of the Opposition
 Kevin Kühnert, member of the Social Democratic Party of Germany
 Ferdinand Lassalle, founder of the General German Workers' Association
 Ken Livingstone, Mayor of London (2000–2008)
 Pierre-Joseph Proudhon, member of the French Parliament in 1848
 Alexandria Ocasio-Cortez, New York Representative
 Bernie Sanders, Senator from Vermont
 Kshama Sawant, Seattle City Council member
 Norman Thomas, six-time Socialist Party of America presidential candidate
 Rashida Tlaib, Michigan Representative

Intellectuals and activists 

 Edward Bellamy, American author, journalist and political activist
 Fred Hampton, American activist and chairman of the Black Panther Party
 Étienne Cabet, French philosopher and utopian socialist
 Jim Cornette, American professional wrestling personality and manager
 Milovan Đilas, Yugoslav communist politician and dissident
 Albert Einstein, German-born theoretical physicist
 Friedrich Engels, German philosopher and sociologist
 Erich Fromm, Jewish German philosopher
 Charles Fourier, French philosopher and utopian socialist
 Henry George, American social reformer
 Charles Hall,  British physician, social critic and Ricardian socialist
 Christopher Hitchens, English-American journalist
 Owen Jones, English journalist and political commentator
 Helen Keller, American political activist
 Martin Luther King Jr., African-American civil rights leader
 Naomi Klein, Canadian author and social activist
 Leszek Kołakowski, Polish philosopher and communist dissident
 Rosa Luxemburg, Polish philosopher and economist
 Karl Marx, German philosopher, sociologist and economist
 John Stuart Mill, British philosopher and economist
 George Orwell, English novelist
 Robert Owen, Welsh social reformer and utopian socialist
 Thomas Paine, English-born American philosopher and political theorist Their concern for both democracy and social justice marked them out as key precursors of democratic socialism.
 Bertrand Russell, British philosopher
 Andrei Sakharov, Soviet physicist, dissident and human rights activist
 Henri de Saint-Simon, French political and economic utopian socialist theorist
 Roger Waters, English musician
 Richard D. Wolff, American economist
 Howard Zinn, American historian

See also 
 List of Democratic Socialists of America members who have held office in the United States

References

Citations

Sources 

 
 
 
 
 
 
 
 
 
 
 
 
 
 
 
 
 

Socialism
Democratic socialists